The Cheikh Al Kamel Mausoleum, also known as the Mausoleum of Sidi Mohammed Ben Aïssa (also spelled Muhammad ibn Isa), is a zawiya (funerary and religious monument) in Meknes, Morocco.

It was founded in the 16th century as the burial place of Mohammed Ben Aïssa (also known as Al-Hadi Ben Aïssa) the great saint of the city of Meknes and founder of a famous Sufi brotherhood of the 16th century, the Aissaoua. It serves as both a mausoleum and a mosque, and is located within the boundaries of a cemetery just outside the walls of the medina (old city) in the district of Bab al-Jadid, south of Bab al-Barda'in. The mausoleum is the focal point of an annual moussem (religious festival) is one of the most intense and was historically known for its displays of self-mutilation.

The current structure dates in part to the reign of the Alaouite sultan Mohammed Ben Abdallah, who built the qubba or mausoleum chamber over the saint's tomb.

References 

Buildings and structures in Meknes
Mausoleums in Morocco